Army Marksmanship Unit may refer to:

 The United States Army Marksmanship Unit
 The Indian Army Marksmanship Unit
 Army Marksmanship Unit, Jhelum, Pakistan

See also
USAMU